Texas A&M University–Kingsville is a public research university in Kingsville, Texas. It is the southernmost campus of the Texas A&M University System. The university developed the nation's first doctoral degree in bilingual education. It is classified among "R2: Doctoral Universities – High research activity".

Texas A&M University–Kingsville is the oldest continuously operating public institution of higher learning in South Texas. The school was chartered as the South Texas Normal School in 1917; however, the opening of the school was delayed due to World War I. Founded in 1925 as South Texas State Teachers College, the university's name changed in 1929 to Texas College of Arts and Industries, or Texas A&I for short, signaled the broadening of its mission. A 1967 name change to Texas A&I University marked another transition. The university became a member of the Texas A&M University System in 1989 and changed its name to Texas A&M University–Kingsville in 1993.

The school has been continuously accredited by the Southern Association of Colleges and Schools (SACS) since 1928.

Academics

Student body
Texas A&M University–Kingsville has a highly diverse student body with 6,357 students pursuing degrees from five academic colleges. The student body is represented by students from 40 U.S. states and more than 35 foreign countries. The student body is split almost evenly with 53% men and 47% women. Undergraduate students represent about 80% of the student population. The student body reflects the high Hispanic population of the South Texas area, with 69% of the students belonging to a Hispanic ethnicity, 15% white, and 4% African-American. Around 7% of students are international students.

Admission
As a Texas public university and a member of the Texas A&M University System, Texas A&M University–Kingsville participates in the Texas "top-10 law", which guarantees admission of the top 10% of Texas public high-school students into public colleges or universities in the state. Whereas certain Texas universities (such as the University of Texas at Austin) can limit these "top 10%" students to 75% of the incoming freshmen class via a tiered system, Texas A&M University–Kingsville offers admission to any student who graduated in the top 10%.

Faculty
More than 75% of the faculty hold terminal degrees (such as PhDs or Ed.D.s.) and have come to the university from more than 41 U.S. states and foreign countries. The university maintains a student/faculty ratio of 16 to one. The Faculty Senate sets academic policy, maintains all faculty committees and the faculty constitution, and assists the university administration with the academic operations and calendar for the school.

Programs
Texas A&M–Kingsville has 56 undergraduate degree programs, 61 master's programs and six doctoral degrees in the Colleges of Agriculture, Natural Resources and Human Sciences, Arts and Sciences, Business Administration, Education and Human Performance, Engineering, and Graduate Studies. The university features the region's only programs in engineering, social sciences and agriculture. A&M–Kingsville's bilingual education program, offering degrees at the master's and doctoral levels, was the first of its kind in the country and continues to be one of the strongest. Undergraduates in nearly all disciplines have an opportunity to participate in research projects.

Rankings

In 2006, Texas A&M Health Science Center Irma Lerma Rangel College of Pharmacy opened as the first professional school of any kind at any university south of San Antonio. 
The Center for Urban Education at the University of Southern California recently identified Texas A&M University–Kingsville as one of the top 25 Hispanic-serving institutions  in America. The school is recognized as being "potential exemplary, or model, of effective practices for increasing the number of Latina and Latino bachelor’s degree holders in science, technology, engineering, and mathematics – known by the acronym STEM." Texas A&M University–Kingsville ranks 43rd out of American colleges and universities in bachelor's degrees awarded to Hispanics according to the Hispanic Outlook in Higher Education Magazine. The magazine also determined that the school ranks seventh in the nation for agriculture degrees and fifth in multi/interdisciplinary studies.

The university's fashion and interiors merchandising program, part of the Department of Human Sciences, was ranked as a top-10 program among schools in the Southwest by Fashion Schools in 2013. The program ranked 10th among all schools with fashion programs in Texas, Oklahoma, Arizona, New Mexico, Colorado, Utah, and Nevada and number 72 among all schools nationally.

Research

The National Natural Toxins Research Center at Texas A&M–Kingsville boasts a large collection of venomous snakes and attracts researchers from around the world to its one-of-a-kind serpentarium. For almost four decades, its mission has been to provide global research, training, and resources that will lead to the discovery of medically important toxins found in snake venoms. They also provide snake venoms, venom fractions, and tissue for biomedical research.

Texas A&M–Kingsville's Caesar Kleberg Wildlife Research Institute is internationally recognized for its research into the conservation and management of wildlife. As the leading wildlife research organization in Texas, it emphasizes research in such fields of study as habitat ecology and management, wildlife biology, ecology and management, wildlife diseases, parasitology, and toxicology, economic development of natural resources, and citizen science. Research scientists and biology and agriculture students conduct research in habitat, toxicology, genetics, and various animal programs, including deer, wild cats, and birds.

The Texas A&M University–Kingsville Citrus Center is known around the world for its work in citrus research and development. The center attracts scholars and research projects from around the world, incorporating undergraduate and graduate student training into its diverse research programs, such as biotechnology, entomology, pathology, and budwood certification. The center is also known for its research and development of several popular varieties of citrus, including the Ruby Red grapefruit.

The Wellhausen Water Resources Center, through its membership in the International Arid Lands Consortium, is playing a role in the Middle East with its expertise in water conservation and development. The newly founded South Texas Environmental Institute plans to bring regional entities together to solve environmental questions through research.

The James C. Jernigan Library is central to the university's goal of offering first-rate academic research. As one of the largest libraries in Texas, the collection boasts more than a half million volumes and over 700,000 microfiche documents. The facility also subscribes to more than 2,200 academic and general-interest periodicals and is designated as a depository for selected U.S. government documents. The library hosts a rare book room that includes precious and uncommon materials from throughout Texas, the Southwest, and the United States.

The facility also houses a Bilingual Center containing many multicultural materials. As the nucleus for research, it contains large computer labs, a dedicated Media Services Center, a special collection containing juvenile literature and a series of ongoing Continuing Education and research development programs. The library also participates in the Interlibrary Loan program, allowing students to access materials from other libraries throughout Texas.

The South Texas Archives and Special Collections, a division of the James C. Jernigan Library hosts one of the largest archival collections in Texas, devoted almost exclusively to the history of South Texas. The South Texas Archives are a state depository that contains the official records from many local towns, cities, special districts, courts, and other regional agencies. In addition, the archive hosts large photograph collections, thousands of written and oral histories of the region, and the collections of many local and state legislators, such as Carlos Truan, Irma Rangel, and J.T. Canales.

Campus

Kingsville, with a population of 25,000, is home to the headquarters of the famed King Ranch and Naval Air Station Kingsville. The Kingsville campus of Texas A&M–Kingsville encompasses  of land, with the bulk of activities occurring within a  main campus that consists of more than 85 buildings.

The architecture of the main campus reflects a Spanish Mission Revival style. The school's first president, R. B. Cousins, decided that the campus should reflect the people and culture of the area. He established the tradition of having each of the buildings on campus reflect a Spanish Mission Revival style of architecture. Nearly every building on the campus has the red tile roofs, towers, and a curved-gable parapet.

The first building constructed, Manning Hall, contains an eastern tower that is a stylized version of the tower at Mission San José. The tower on the west is a replica of the tower at Mission Concepcion. The curved-gable parapet represents the Alamo, the famous former mission located in San Antonio.

In addition to the main campus, the university operates several satellite campuses around the main campus. This includes the agricultural research area to the west of campus, the TAMUK Rodeo Arena and livestock area to the north of campus, and the Tio and Janell Kleberg Wildlife Research Park adjacent to the northwestern entrance of the main campus on Corral Avenue.

The university recently developed a new master plan for the campus. In May 2010, details of the plan were released to the public. This plan calls for a multimillion-dollar improvement of the current campus infrastructure along with the development of several new buildings, walkways, green spaces, and parking additions. In addition to new and improved structures, the campus will undergo a campus beautification project that will include new signs, lighting, landscaping, and remodeling of existing outdoor facilities. 

In addition, Texas A&M-Kingsville maintains two large research farms known as the Texas A&M University–Kingsville Citrus Center in Weslaco. Scientists and researchers at the center seek to find innovative solutions for the global citrus industry while developing variations in citrus (such as the 'Ruby Red', 'Star Ruby', and 'Rio Red' grapefruit varieties) through cutting-edge scientific techniques.

Student life

Residential life
The majority of undergraduate students at Texas A&M-Kingsville live on campus in one of several major dormitory buildings. Turner Hall, Bishop Hall, Martin Hall, Lynch Hall, University Village, and Mesquite Village West house approximately 2,300 students in a shared or private dormitory environment. In addition to traditional male and female dorms, Texas A&M University–Kingsville provides many apartment style residence halls and suites that house approximately 1,200 students. Many of the residence halls on campus provide distinct "Living Learning Communities" for students. This optional housing arrangement helps provide a fraternal residential atmosphere for students from diverse backgrounds, academic fields and interests. These communities currently include Fitness and Wellness, Music, Engineering, Agriculture and Wildlife, Fashionista, Leadership, Technology and Honors.

The university recently completed a new residence hall with 600 beds in a suite-style environment. The university recently broke ground on a new residence hall that will also house students in the Honors College.

During the fall of 2010, the university received state authorization to begin planning and construction for a third new residence hall, to be completed in 2012.

Another student dormitory, Mesquite Village West, opened in time for the Fall 2011 school year. At a cost of more than $18 Million, this 98,000 square foot building provides suite-style two and four bedroom apartments with a kitchenette, living room and one or two bathrooms per unit. It also provides three separated housing wings, including Fashionista, Technology and Honors themed communities.

Many students choose to obtain meals at various university dining halls and restaurants. In addition to the restaurants located on campus, the university operates several large dining halls in the dormitories and Student Union Building. The university is also building a new dining hall that will be able to accommodate 378 students at one time. Along with this new dining hall, resident students can also use the cafeteria located in Turner-Bishop Hall, Martin Hall or at the various restaurants located in the Memorial Student Union Building. There is also a new cafe located in the James C. Jernigan Library.

The Memorial Student Union Building (commonly called the MSUB or SUB) is often referred to as the "living room of campus." It is home to the Office of Financial Aid, the Office of Student Activities, the Dean of Students, several ballrooms and meeting rooms. The building also houses a Pizza Hut, Starbucks, Chick-fil-A, Taco Taco and a Subway. Dining services throughout the campus are provided by Aramark, operating as Javelina Dining. The building also hosts a large university bookstore, operated by Barnes & Noble. The Memorial Student Union Building also accommodates a large game room with a dozen pool tables, ping pong tables, a computer and study hall section, several large flat screen televisions, and a video arcade room.

Activities
The university recently opened a new Student Recreation Center. It also contains  square feet for a new cardio fitness and weight room with an elevated track. It was officially opened in April 2010.

The Steinke Physical Education Center (SPEC) is home to the university's Department of Kinesiology. The multistory complex also houses various recreational concourses that provide many activities for students, faculty, and staff throughout the semester. Among these are a bowling alley, racquetball courts, an Olympic sized swimming pool, a fitness center, and large locker rooms.

The school has many activities available to students and residents throughout the year. The Office of University Housing and Residence Life and the Office of Student Activities sponsor many activities throughout the year, including Hoggie Days (a student orientation program), fall and spring festivals, picnics, dorm activities. The Office of Student Activities also hosts free weekend movie events in the Peacock Auditorium, lawn and drive-in movie events, recreational sports, Family Weekend events, the Homecoming Bonfire, and several other traditional school spirit or entertainment activities throughout the year.

Media

Texas A&M University-Kingsville is home to several prestigious media outlets. The South Texan is the school's official newspaper. It is a newspaper produced by students and has been in continuous publication since 1925. The South Texan has produced a distinguished list of journalists who now work in media outlets across the nation. The university offers broadcast media outlets as well. KTAI 91.1 FM, the school's official radio station, has been in operation for over 40 years. As Kingsville's only radio station, KTAI is a student-operated radio station that provides a mix of music, news, and live sports programming. The school also offers a campus television station, TAMUK TV-2, which is aired throughout the campus and via local cable television. Like KTAI, TAMUK TV-2 offers students the opportunity to work in various aspects and roles of broadcast media while earning college credit. Many students have moved on to work in radio and television throughout Texas. Both KTAI and TAMUK TV-2 are operated under the auspices of the Radio and Television division of the Communications and Theater Arts Department.

Student organizations
The university hosts a number of student organizations, including a number of Greek-letter academic honor societies, academic and professional societies, political clubs, religious student organizations, and many others. There are approximately 105 student organizations at Texas A&M University–Kingsville. They are divided into categories: academic, community service, honor societies, faith-based, spirit & tradition, cultural/international, military, sports, Greek, performing & visual arts, social & political issues, student government, student media, health & recreation, programming, and special interest.

Academic

College of Arts and Sciences
 Javelina Broadcast Network
 Press Club

College of Education and Human Performance
Texas Association of Students for Bilingual Education (TASBE)
HKN Club

College of Engineering 
 Engineering Student Council (ESC)
 Architectural Engineering Institute (AEI)
 American Society of Mechanical Engineers
 American Nuclear Society (ANS)
 American Institute of Chemical Engineers
 Society of Women Engineers
 American Society of Civil Engineers
 National Society of Black Engineers
 Society of Manufacturing Engineers (SME)
 Society of Hispanic Professional Engineers
 Society of Mexican American Engineers and Scientists
 Society of Petroleum Engineers
 American Institute of Aeronautics and Astronautics
 Institute of Electrical and Electronics Engineers
 Marine Technology Society
 Association for Computing Machinery
 Information school

College of Business Administration 
 Delta Mu Delta
 Delta Sigma Pi
 Association of Information Technology Professionals

Greek life
The university is home to chapters or colonies of several Greek fraternities and sororities, including:

Fraternities:

 Kappa Sigma
 Lambda Chi Alpha
 Sigma Lambda Beta
 Sigma Chi
 Omega Delta Phi
 Omega Psi Phi
 Delta Chi

Sororities:

 Alpha Kappa Alpha
 Alpha Sigma Alpha
 Delta Phi Epsilon
 Theta Phi Alpha
 Kappa Delta Chi

Honor Societies
 Alpha Lambda Delta (ΑΓΔ) – 1924; co-ed freshman year honor society
 Alpha Phi Omega (ΑΦΏ) – 1925; co-ed service fraternity
 Alpha Psi Omega (ΑΨΏ) – 1925; co-ed theatre fraternity
 Beta Gamma Sigma (ΒΓΣ) – 1913; co-ed business fraternity
 Delta Omicron (ΔΟ) – 1909; co-ed music fraternity
 Eta Sigma Phi (ΣΦ) – 1924; co-ed classical honor society
 Kappa Delta Pi (ΚΔΠ) – 1911; co-ed international education honor society
Lambda Pi Eta (ΛΠΣ) – 1985; co-ed communication studies honor society 
 Phi Alpha Theta (ΦΑΘ) – 1921; co-ed history honor society
 Phi Beta Delta (ΦΒΔ) – 1986; co-ed international studies honor society
 Phi Eta Sigma (ΦΗΣ) – 1923; co-ed freshman honor society
 Phi Sigma Pi (ΦΣΠ) – 1916; co-ed academic honor society
 Pi Delta Phi (ΠΔΦ) – 1967; co-ed French honor society
 Pi Gamma Mu (ΠΓΜ) – 1924; co-ed social sciences honor society*
 Pi Sigma Alpha (ΦΣΑ) – 1920; co-ed political science honor society
 Psi Chi (ΨΧ) – 1929; co-ed psychology honor society
 Sigma Gamma Epsilon (ΣΓΕ) – 1915; co-ed earth sciences honor society
 Tau Beta Pi (ΤΒΠ) – 1885; co-ed engineering honor society

Athletics

Texas A&M–Kingsville (TAMUK) athletic teams are the Javelinas. The university is a member of the Division II level of the National Collegiate Athletic Association (NCAA), primarily competing in the Lone Star Conference (LSC) since the 1954–55 academic year.

Texas A&M–Kingsville (TAMUK) competes in 13 intercollegiate varsity sports: Men's sports include baseball, basketball, cross country, football and track & field; while women's sports include basketball, beach volleyball, cross country, golf, softball, tennis, track & field and volleyball.

The Javelinas has seen much success in athletics, winning several conference titles, most recently in baseball and football.

Football

The perennial success in football led some to dub the school as a "football factory" with 7 National Championships: 1979, 1976, 1975, 1974, 1970, 1969, 1959 and 34 Conference Championships: 1931, 1932, 1938, 1939, 1941, 1951, 1952, 1959, 1960, 1962, 1967–70, 1974–77, 1979, 1985, 1987–89, 1992–97, 2001–04, 2009. The university holds the record as the Division II school with the most professional athletes signed by teams in the NFL, including Pro Football Hall of Fame inductees Gene Upshaw, Darrell Green, and John Randle.

Because of its great success, attendance at football games in Javelina Stadium ranks amongst the highest in NCAA Division II. Javelina Stadium has more than 18,000 seats, which is one of the largest Division II football stadiums in the nation. Javelina Stadium has been chosen to host the NCAA Division II Cactus Bowl every year since 2001. The Cactus Bowl draws the best senior football players from Division II football for NFL scouting activities and culminates in a game pitting seniors from the East against seniors from the West.

Other sports

The university offers no less than ten NCAA sanctioned sports, including five men's sports and 5 women's sports. Facilities include Javelina Stadium for football, track, and field; the Gil H. Steinke Physical Education Center for volleyball and men's and women's basketball; Nolan Ryan Field for baseball; and Vernie & Blanche Hubert Field for softball. In addition, the campus maintains facilities for tennis, soccer, racketball, swimming, platform diving and other various indoor sports.

The Department of Kinesiology and the Office of Student Activities also provide competitive intramural sports activities for students at the university. Students can compete in basketball, flag football, bowling, softball, soccer and other intramural sports hosted at the school. Many of these intramural sports leagues are hosted in the new Student Recreation Center that opened during the Spring 2010 semester.

Traditions

Texas A&M University-Kingsville is an institution rich in traditions. Many of the school's traditions are as old as the school itself, while others are much more recent. Some traditions are official, while others have become traditions by default through years of recurrence.

Current

 School colors: The school's official colors are Blue and Gold. These colors are reflected around the campus. They are seen in the uniforms of athletes, coaches, and band members. They are also found on flags, school apparel and are proudly worn during sporting events.
 Mascot: The Javelina is the official mascot of Texas A&M University–Kingsville. The mascot is paraded during official school events and games. Over the years, various mascots named Henry, Henrietta, Little Henry, Scrappy and Porky have held the honor as an official mascot. The current mascot is named Porky III.
 Alma mater: The official song of the university is Hail AMK.
 Bell chimes: Every quarter-hour, the bell chimes can be heard from atop College Hall. At the top of the hour, additional strokes will indicate the time of day. At the close of the school day, the tower will play the Alma Mater.
 School songs: The official fighting song for TAMUK is Jalisco and is played by the band following every touchdown. In addition, the Javelina Victory March is played after every field goal or extra point. Other songs are played during the games, often followed by a chant of “Go Hogs Go!”

 Pride of South Texas Marching Band: This is the award-winning marching band of the school. The band has participated in competitions throughout Texas and the United States. They routinely perform during half-time of home football games. In addition, the band plays the school's alma mater, Hail AMK, at the end of football games.
 Bonfire: During homecoming week, a large bonfire is held in a field located adjacent to the soccer field and softball stadium. The bonfire is sponsored by the Aggie Club and is open to the student body, faculty, staff and alumni of the university.
 Homecoming King and Queen: In the weeks preceding the homecoming, members of various student organizations campaign for King and Queen. Students vote for the candidates of their choice, and the results are announced during half-time at the Homecoming Game.
 Tailgate party: A tailgate party is hosted in the northeastern parking lot of Javelina Stadium before each home football game. These gatherings have become a normal part of Javelina football games and attract thousands of fans. The tailgate party is open to the public and many student organizations, clubs, and surrounding businesses around the area choose to participate with lots of food, drinks, and music.
 Hoggie Days: The official and mandatory freshmen orientation of the university occurs prior to the beginning of each fall or spring semester. Events are designed to help students and parents become familiar with the traditions, procedures and experiences of life at Texas A&M University–Kingsville.
 Fall Carnival/Spring Fling: Each fall and spring, a large festival is held along University Blvd. in the center of campus. The Office of Student Activities hosts several bands and plenty of free activities. In addition, a majority of student organizations host booths, contests, games and food selections as well.
 Mesquite Groove: Every year, the KTAI radio station hosts a concert series at the stage in the Mesquite Grove located on the southern portion of the campus.
 Miss TAMUK pageant: Each spring, the Office of Student Activities holds a themed scholarship pageant. Female students compete for the title to become representatives of the university at community and school sponsored events. Past winners include Eva Longoria.
 Freshman night out: Each fall, the incoming freshman class is encouraged to attend dinner with the various faculty and staff of the university at one of the university dining halls. The purpose of this event is to allow incoming freshmen to have an opportunity to become familiar with many of the professors at the school.
 Class ring: The school has an official class ring. Graduating seniors are encouraged to order their rings and attend a special ceremony shortly before graduation.
 Graduation: Graduation commencement ceremonies are held following the spring, fall and summer semesters.

 Study abroad: Students are encouraged to study abroad during their education at TAMUK. Educational exchange programs allow students to receive college credit from the cultural study in Mexico, Spain, France, Germany, England, Australia, Italy, India, Canada, Botswana, and Taiwan. The Office of International Studies and Programs has set up a scholarship fund to assist students in this endeavor.
 Army ROTC: The University is the proud home of Javelina Battalion, an official Army ROTC program. Cadets who complete the Army ROTC course at TAMUK become commissioned officers in the U.S. Army. In addition to coursework and sanctioned activities, the cadets of Javelina Battalion present colors during official school functions. Javelina Battalion upholds several internal traditions, including the firing of “Old Smokey” (prior to 1965, cadets fired a cannon known as "Little Jav") during home football games as well as sponsoring the Military Ball each year since 1975.
 Honor Code: In the effort to encourage academic and scholastic purity, students at Texas A&M University–Kingsville are expected to abide by the Javelina Honor Code. The Principles of the Javelina Honor Code include five fundamental values that must be adhered by students, including honesty, trust, fairness, respect and responsibility.

 Honor Pledge: The accompanying Javelina Honor Pledge states, "As a student of Texas A&M University-Kingsville, I pledge to conduct myself honorably and to uphold high standards in all academic work, and to adhere to all of the values set forth in the Javelina Honor Code."
 Business Etiquette Dinner: During the fall and spring semesters, students are expected to attend a special dinner that provides training in formal dinner manners and protocol. This entertaining black tie event has become a staple of the TAMUK experience.
 Movie nights: The Campus Activity Board hosts special movie nights throughout the year. Movies are typically recent releases and are shown in the Peacock Auditorium of the Biology-Earth Sciences Building, on the lawn in the center of campus or as special drive-in films in the western parking lot of Javelina Stadium.
 Midnight breakfast: During final examinations, the cafeterias around the university offer free late-night meals (including breakfast) to assist with late night study.
 Rush Week: This is the official recruiting method of the various Greek societies found at the university. During Rush, the fraternities and sororities set up recruitment stations around campus in order to promote their organizations.
 Moon Festival: This annual celebration in the courtyard of the Memorial Student Union Building kicks off the various Asian Pacific Heritage events around the campus. Visitors are treated to Asian food, visuals and entertainment that celebrates the cultures of Asia.
 See You at the Pole: During an early morning each September, students from the various religious student organizations meet around the flag pole at College Hall in order to pray for the school year.
 Holiday decorations: Prior to the November Thanksgiving holiday, students, faculty and staff are invited to assist in decorating the campus for the winter holidays.

Football games

In addition to the traditions mentioned above, there are many other traditions that are displayed during football games.
 Pep rallies: Enthusiastic rallies are held before each game.
 Tailgate Party: The tailgate party is held before each home game in the northeastern parking lot of Javelina Stadium.
 Blue Out: During home games, students are encouraged to participate in a “Blue Out” – where students wear their school colors in a sign of school spirit.
 Porky's Pack & Train: Children who become members of Porky's Pack accompany Porky the Javelina mascot on a train ride around the stadium throughout the game.
 Blue Thunder: Prior to kickoff, students sitting on the west side of the stadium repeatedly kick the metal rails beneath their seat in a sign of school solidarity, resulting in a very loud and thunderous clamor.
 Flag Run: Following each touchdown scored by the Javelinas, two separate school flags are run around the stadium by members of the Aggie Club.
 "Old Smokey:" In addition, cadets of the TAMUK Army ROTC the “Old Smokey” cannon during every home game.
 Tortilla toss: During the 1980s, students began to throw tortillas following every touchdown as a show of support for the football team. This tradition has halted in 1999 after some students complained of possible racial undertones. School officials subsequently banned tortillas from the stadium; however, tortillas continue to be thrown during the game.
 College Hall blue lights: Following each football victory, the bell tower atop College Hall is lit up with blue lights. These lights provide an ethereal reminder to the campus community of each victory.

Notable alumni

Mike Adams, MLB pitcher, Texas Rangers
Elsa Alcala, judge of the Texas Court of Criminal Appeals; former Houston prosecutor and state and intermediate appeals court judge
 Johnny Bailey, retired NFL running back
 Sid Blanks, retired NFL running back, Houston Oilers and the New England Patriots. First African American player in the Lone Star Conference
 Michael T. Boyd, Emmy Award-winning costume designer for film and television
 J. E. "Buster" Brown (B.S. in secondary education), Texas politician
 Laura Canales, Tejano singer, known as the "Queen of Tejana music"
 Juan Castillo, NFL Coach, Baltimore Ravens offensive line coach
 James Crumley, crime novelist, author of The Last Great Kiss and other works
 Jorge Diaz, retired NFL offensive lineman, Tampa Bay Buccaneers, Dallas Cowboys
 Earl Dotson, retired NFL offensive tackle for the Green Bay Packers
 Ramón H. Dovalina (B.S. and M.S.), former president of Laredo Community College
 George Floyd, best known for being a fatal victim of police brutality, and the inspiration behind both national and international protests, he transferred to Texas A&M University–Kingsville in 1995 and played basketball for the school but left before graduating.
 Carmen Lomas Garza, artist
 Roberto Garza, retired NFL offensive lineman, Atlanta Falcons, Chicago Bears
 Darrell Green, Pro Football Hall of Famer, retired cornerback for the Washington Redskins
 Don Hardeman, retired NFL running back, Houston Oilers and Baltimore Colts
 Al Harris, NFL Cornerback for the Green Bay Packers
 Dwight Harrison, retired NFL cornerback, Denver Broncos, Buffalo Bills and Oakland Raiders
 David Hill, retired NFL tight end, Detroit Lions and Los Angeles Rams
 Jim Hill, retired NFL player for the Green Bay Packers and San Diego Chargers, Sports anchor at KCBS-TV in Los Angeles
 Armando Hinojosa, sculptor
 Rubén Hinojosa, Member of the U.S. House of Representatives from Texas's 15th District
 Tom Janik, former American Football League safety and punter, Denver Broncos, Buffalo Bills and New England Patriots
 Levi Johnson, retired NFL cornerback, Detroit Lions
 Randy Johnson, (June 17, 1944 – September 17, 2009) was an American football player. He was the starting quarterback for the Atlanta Falcons in their inaugural season of 1966. In 1974 he played with The Hawaiians of the World Football League.
 Eva Longoria, actress and model
 Maurice Lukefahr, agricultural scientist, known for research into plant resistance to insect pests
 Alvin Matthews, retired NFL cornerback, Green Bay Packers, San Francisco 49ers
 Jose S. Mayorga, Current Adjutant General of Texas National Guard
 Jermane Mayberry, NFL Guard for the New Orleans Saints
 Eddie Moten, AFL Cornerback for the Orlando Predators
 Marwan M. Muwalla, president of University of Petra
 Dwayne Nix, College Football Hall of Famer
 Ernest Price, retired NFL defensive lineman, Detroit Lions and Seattle Seahawks
 John Randle, retired NFL Hall of fame defensive tackle
 Richard Ritchie, College Football Hall of Famer, Quarterback. Attorney at Law.
 Pete Saenz, B.S. and MS., mayor of Laredo, Texas
 Ricardo Sanchez, U.S. Army Lt. General
 Mario Santos Jr. (Class of 1963), sheriff of Webb County from 1977 to 1988
 Kimberly A. Scott, actress
 Heath Sherman, retired NFL running back for the Philadelphia Eagles
 Gil Steinke, NFL defensive back for the Philadelphia Eagles. Longtime coach of the Javelinas. Texas Sports Hall of Fame, deceased
 Carlos Truan, member of both houses of the Texas Legislature from 1969 to 2003
 Gene Upshaw, Pro Football Hall of Famer, former Executive Director of the National Football League Players Association, deceased
 Buzz Williams, current head coach of the Texas A&M men's basketball team

References

External links
 
 Official athletics website

 
Kingsville, Texas
Universities and colleges accredited by the Southern Association of Colleges and Schools
Public universities and colleges in Texas
Texas A&M University System
Education in Kleberg County, Texas
Buildings and structures in Kleberg County, Texas